Instituto Piaget is a Portuguese private institution of higher education. It provides both university and polytechnic higher education in a number of fields. Instituto Piaget was named after the Swiss philosopher and developmental psychologist Jean Piaget.

It has campuses in several locations of Portugal, namely in Almada, Macedo de Cavaleiros, Santo André, Silves, Vila Nova de Gaia and Viseu.

Besides the campuses in Portugal, the Instituto Piaget has affiliated institutions in Angola, Brazil, Cape Verde, Guinea-Bissau and Mozambique.

Academics in Portugal

Campuses, institutes and schools
 Almada University Campus:
 Jean Piaget School of Education of Almada
 Institute of Intercultural and Transdisciplinary Studies of Almada
 Macedo de Cavaleiros Academic Campus:
 Jean Piaget School of Education of Macedo de Cavaleiros
 Jean Piaget School of Health of Macedo de Cavaleiros
 Silves Academic Campus:
 Jean Piaget School of Health of Silves
 Vila Nova de Gaia Academic Campus:
 Jean Piaget School of Education of Vila Nova de Gaia
 Jean Piaget School of Health of Vila Nova de Gaia
 Santo André Academic Campus:
 Jean Piaget School of Technology and Management
 Viseu University Campus:
 Jean Piaget School of Education of Viseu
 Jean Piaget School of Health of Viseu
 Institute of Intercultural and Transdisciplinary Studies of Viseu

Programmes
 Bachelor (licenciatura) degrees:
 Environment, health and safety
 Sociocultural animation
 Food science
 Dietetics 
 Basic education
 Physical education and sports
 Nursing
 Petroleum engineering 
 Pharmacy
 Physiotherapy
 Osteopathy
 Management
 Human movement
 Music
 Psychology
 Radiology
 Occupational therapy
 Master's degrees:
 Sustained health cares
 Special education
 Pre-school education
 Pre-school education and 1st cycle of basic education teaching
 Physical education teaching in the basic and secondary education
 Musical education teaching in the basic education
 Music teaching
 1st and 2nd cycles of basic education teaching
 Food processing and innovation
 Health and clinic psychology
 Organizational and social psychology
 Pedagogics supervision and evaluation
 Other programmes:
Besides bachelor and master programmes, Instituto Piaget also offers non-degree granting programmes in the fields of education, health, environment and tourism.

International academics
Instituto Piaget also has a presence out of Portugal, with a number of affiliated higher education institutions in several Portuguese speaking countries, namely:
 Universidade Jean Piaget de Angola - Viana and Benguela, Angola
 Faculdade Piaget - Suzano, São Paulo, Brazil
 Universidade Jean Piaget de Cabo Verde - Praia and Mindelo, Cape Verde
 Universidade Jean Piaget da Guiné-Bissau - Bissau, Guinea-Bissau
 Universidade Jean Piaget de Moçambique - Beira, Mozambique

See also
Higher education in Portugal
List of higher education institutions in Portugal

External links
 

Higher education in Portugal